Longsheng is a town in Longsheng Various Nationalities Autonomous County, Guangxi, China.

History

In 1742, Longsheng was formed as a city after the suppression of a rebellion led by Wu Jinyin.

In 1945, it was known as "Rixin Street".

After the establishment of the Communist State, its name was replaced by Rixin Town in 1958 and Chengguan Town in 1963. In February 1964, it was renamed "Longsheng Town Commune". In November 1979, its name was changed to "Longsheng Town".

Geography

Longsheng is located in central Longsheng Various Nationalities Autonomous County. It is surrounded by Lejiang Town on the north, Sishui Township on the northeast, Piaoli Town on the west, Sanmen on the southwest, Longji Town on the southeast, and Lingui District on the south.

The Xun River flows through the town west to northeast.

The Heping River and Pingye River run through the town. 

Administrative divisions
As of 2020, the town is divided into 5 residential communities and 14 villages.

Residential communities 
Longsheng administers the following 5 residential communities:
 Chengnan Community
 Chengbei Community
 Guilong Community
 Chengxi Community
Bei'an Community

Villages 
Longsheng administers the following 14 villages:
 Chengguan
 Shuanghe
 Lehuang
 Duping
 Pingye
 Chonglou
 Lingtian
 Shangmeng
 Jinche
 Jinjie
 Shuangdong
 Rixin
 Shandong
 Nanmen

Demographics 
The village of Jinjie and Shuangdong are home to a concentration of ethnic Zhuang people.

Transportation

The China National Highway 321, commonly referred to as "G321", is a west-southeast highway passing through commercial and residential area west of the town limits. 

The G65 Baotou–Maoming Expressway, more commonly known as "Bao-Mao Expressway", runs west to southeast of the town.

References

Bibliography

Towns of Guilin